Daboia siamensis (Common name: eastern Russell's viper, Siamese Russell's viper, more) is a venomous viper species, which is endemic to parts of Southeast Asia, southern China and Taiwan. It was formerly considered to be a subspecies of Daboia russelii (as Daboia russelli siamensis), but was elevated to species status in 2007.

Description
Dorsally, the color pattern is the same as that of D. russelii, except that the color is more grayish or olive, with small spots between the large spot rows. The venter is suffused with gray posteriorly.

Common names
Common names for D. siamensis include eastern Russell's viper and Siamese Russell's viper.

Previously, other common names were used to describe subspecies that are now part of the synonymy of this species: Indonesian Russell's viper for "limitis", and Formosan Russell's viper for "formosensis".

Geographic range
Daboia siamensis is found in Myanmar, Thailand, Cambodia, China(Guangxi Guangdong), parts of India, Taiwan and Indonesia (Endeh, Flores, east Java, Komodo, Lomblen Islands).

Brown (1973) mentions that D. siamensis can also found in Vietnam, Laos and on the Indonesian island of Sumatra. Ditmars (1937) reportedly received a specimen from Sumatra as well. However, its distribution in the Indonesian archipelago is still being elucidated.

Antivenom
As of 2016, antivenoms for Daboia siamensis were produced in India, Myanmar and Thailand.

References

Further reading
Smith MA (1917). "Descriptions of New Reptiles and a New Batrachian from Siam". Journal of the Natural History Society of Siam 2 (3): 221-225. (Vipera russelli siamensis, new subspecies, pp. 223–224 + photograph).
Smith MA (1943). The Fauna of British India, Ceylon and Burma, Including the Whole of the Indo-Chinese Sub-region. Reptilia and Batrachia, Vol. III.—Serpentes. London: Secretary of State for India. (Taylor and Francis, printers). xii + 583 pp. ("Vipera russelli siamensis", p. 484).

External links

Russell's Viper (on the island of Komodo) at Globaljuggler. Accessed 20 October 2006.
Daboia siamensis - Siamese Russells Viper in Thailand Information

siamensis
Snakes of Southeast Asia
Reptiles of Cambodia
Reptiles of China
Reptiles of Indonesia
Reptiles of Myanmar
Reptiles of Taiwan
Reptiles of Thailand
Reptiles described in 1917
Taxa named by Malcolm Arthur Smith